Cynthia Cruz is a contemporary American poet. She is the author of seven published poetry collections, and two works of cultural criticism. She currently teaches classes in the Graduate Writing Program at Columbia University.

Life
Born in Wiesbaden, Germany, Cruz grew up in Germany and in northern California.

She earned her B.A. at Mills College. She earned her M.F.A. at Sarah Lawrence College, an MFA in Art Writing & Criticism at the School of Visual Arts and an MA in German Language and Literature at Rutgers University-New Brunswick. Cruz is currently pursuing her PhD in Philosophy at the European Graduate School. Her research centers on Hegel.

Work
Her first collection of poems, Ruin, was published by Alice James Books in 2006, and reviewed by The New York Times Sunday Book Review, Library Journal and received a starred review from Publishers Weekly. Her second collection The Glimmering Room was published by Four Way Books and launched at the contemporary art gallery Hansel and Gretel Picture Garden; it was also reviewed by The New York Times alongside the poet C. K. Williams. Her third collection, Wunderkammer, was published in 2014 by Four Way Books, "How the End Begins" was published in 2016, "Dregs," in 2018, and "Guidebooks for the Dead" in 2020. Her books have been reviewed widely. Her seventh collection of poems, "Hotel Oblivion," nominated for the Kingsley Tufts Award  and the National Book Critics Circle Award  was published in 2022.

She has published poems in numerous literary journals and magazines including BOMB Magazine,'The New Yorker  AGNI, The American Poetry Review, Boston Review, Denver Quarterly, Guernica and The Paris Review, and in anthologies including Isn't it Romantic: 100 Love Poems by Younger Poets (Wave Books, 2004), and The Iowa Anthology of New American Poetries, edited by poet Reginald Shepherd (University of Iowa Press, 2004). She is the recipient of fellowships from Yaddo, the MacDowell Colony, and a Hodder Followship from Princeton University. In spring of 2019 Disquieting: Essays on Silence, a collection of critical essays, was published by Book*hug. A second collection of cultural criticism, The Melancholia of Class, was published by Repeater Books in 2021. 

Cruz is editor, with the visual artist, Steven Page, of the interdisciplinary journal, Schlag Magazine.

References 

Living people
German poets
Poets from California
Sarah Lawrence College alumni
Sarah Lawrence College faculty
Mills College alumni
Princeton University fellows
Fordham University faculty
American women poets
American writers of Mexican descent
Year of birth missing (living people)
American women academics
21st-century American women